Verkh-Inva is a rural locality (a selo) and the administrative center of Verkh-Invenskoye Rural Settlement, Kudymkarsky District, Perm Krai, Russia. The population was 1,137 as of 2010. There are 28 streets.

Geography 
Verkh-Inva is located 25 km southwest of Kudymkar (the district's administrative centre) by road. Kuzolova is the nearest rural locality.

References 

Rural localities in Kudymkarsky District